The Gulf of Nicoya is an inlet of the Pacific Ocean. It separates the Nicoya Peninsula from the mainland of Costa Rica, and encompasses a marine and coastal landscape of wetlands, rocky islands and cliffs.

The first Spanish landing in Nicaragua took place here in 1519.

Islands
Chira Island
Venado Island
Isla Caballo
Isla Bejuco
Isla San Lucas 
Isla Gitana
Tortuga Island, Costa Rica

References

External links
 

Bays of Costa Rica
Nicoya
Geography of Guanacaste Province
Geography of Puntarenas Province